Proto Thema is a Greek newspaper, published every Sunday. It was founded in 2005 by Themos Anastasiadis, Makis Triantafyllopoulos, and Tassos Karamitsos.

Proto Thema has repeatedly achieved sales of over 400,000 and has become the greatest success story in the history of Greek media. Throughout its era with Themos Anastasiadis as publisher Thema was the best-known, most influential and the biggest Greek newspaper. As of 2006, it frequently led the chart of top-selling Sunday newspapers, ahead of To Vima and Eleftherotypia. Proto Thema A.E. the company the publishes the newspaper also owns several websites, magazines and a radio station. Additionally, it is important to mention that Thema is the only Greek newspaper with low borrowing and high profitability. 

In late December 2005, the newspaper broke the story of an alleged coverup by the Greek government of torture of Pakistani terrorist suspects.

Triantafyllopoulos left the newspaper after a disagreement with his partners related to Zachopoulos's (a former minister in Kostas Karamanlis government) sex scandal.

The newspaper has been widely being criticised of being closely affiliated and/or even getting funded through third-party sources with the New Democracy political party and supporting the current Prime Minister of Greece, Kyriakos Mitsotakis.

The newspaper reportedly harassed Ingeborg Beugel, a Dutch journalist, by releasing her address to the public.

After the death of Themos Anastasiadis the newspaper was taken over by  Tassos Karamitsos, who is its new publisher.

References

External links
 

Weekly newspapers published in Greece
Greek-language newspapers
2005 establishments in Greece
Publications established in 2005